Yang Chieh-mei (born 23 July 1967) is a Taiwanese actress who won Golden Bell Award for Best Supporting Actress in 2002.

Filmography

Film

Series

Awards

References

External links 
 
 

1967 births
Living people
Taiwanese television actresses
Taiwanese film actresses
20th-century Taiwanese actresses
21st-century Taiwanese actresses